Ben Martin (born August 26, 1987) is an American professional golfer who plays on the PGA Tour.

Professional career
As an amateur, Martin played in three major championships and was the runner-up at the 2009 U.S. Amateur. Having turned professional in 2010, he won in his second professional event, and finished runner-up at qualifying school for the PGA Tour at the end of the year.

In 2011 on the PGA Tour, Martin made the cut in 12 of 25 events and failed to earn enough money to retain his card for 2012. He played on the Web.com Tour in 2012 and 2013, picking up his first tour win at the 2013 United Leasing Championship. He finished second on the 2013 Web.com Tour regular season money list to earn his 2014 PGA Tour card. On October 19, 2014, Martin played the last four holes in 4-under-par, including a 46-foot eagle putt on the 16th hole to earn his first career PGA Tour win at the Shriners Hospitals for Children Open by two strokes over Kevin Streelman.

In 2014, Martin's second full season the PGA Tour, he finished 76th in the final FedEx Cup standings. He had three top-10 finishes on the season, including a solo third at the Puerto Rico Open and a tie for third at the RBC Heritage and the Quicken Loans National. 

Martin's 2015 campaign got off to a quick start with a victory in his second event of the season at the Shriners Hospitals for Children Open, his first of his career. He then added top-10s at the Arnold Palmer Invitational, The Players Championship and the Crowne Plaza Invitational at Colonial.

Professional wins (4)

PGA Tour wins (1)

Web.com Tour wins (2)

Web.com Tour playoff record (1–0)

EGolf Professional Tour wins (1)
2010 Forest Oaks Classic

Results in major championships

CUT = missed the half-way cut
"T" = tied

Results in The Players Championship

CUT = missed the halfway cut
"T" indicates a tie for a place
C = Canceled after the first round due to the COVID-19 pandemic

Results in World Golf Championships

"T" = Tied

See also
2010 PGA Tour Qualifying School graduates
2013 Web.com Tour Finals graduates
2022 Korn Ferry Tour Finals graduates

References

External links

American male golfers
Clemson Tigers men's golfers
PGA Tour golfers
Korn Ferry Tour graduates
Golfers from Georgia (U.S. state)
Golfers from South Carolina
Sportspeople from Rome, Georgia
People from Greenwood, South Carolina
1987 births
Living people